Ancita germari is a species of beetle in the family Cerambycidae. It was described by Francis Polkinghorne Pascoe in 1865. It is found in Australia.

References

Ancita
Beetles described in 1865